Bulbophyllum rigidum is a species of orchid in the genus Bulbophyllum. The species of orchids are found in eastern Himalayas, Assam India, Nepal, Bhutan and Sikkim in evergreen temperate forests.

References
The Bulbophyllum-Checklist
The Internet Orchid Species Photo Encyclopedia

rigidum